Agua Grande Lagoon (Laguna Agua Grande) is a large coastal lagoon in Sinaloa, Mexico.  Agua Grande Lagoon is drained into the Pacific Ocean by the Teacapan Estuary.

References

Lagoons of Mexico
Landforms of Sinaloa
Pacific Coast of Mexico